Al Davis (1929–2011) was an American football executive.

Al Davis may also refer to:

Al Davis (baseball), American baseball player
Al Davis (boxer) (1920–1945), American boxer
Al Davis (politician) (born 1952), member of the Nebraska Legislature, elected in 2012
Allen Lee Davis (1944–1999), American executed murderer

See also
Allen Davis (disambiguation)
Allan Davis (disambiguation)
Alan Davis (disambiguation)
Albert Davis (disambiguation)
Alan Davies (disambiguation)
Alun Davies (disambiguation)
Al Davies (disambiguation)